4 Devils (also known as Four Devils) is a 1928 American silent drama film directed by German director F. W. Murnau and starring Janet Gaynor. It is considered to be lost.

Premise
The plot concerns four orphans (Janet Gaynor, Nancy Drexel, Barry Norton, and Charles Morton) who become a high wire act, and centers around sinister goings-on at a circus. An old clown takes in the four children Charles, Adolf, Marion and Louise to protect them from the brutal circus owner who is their guardian. He raises them and trains them to become acrobats. The years pass and the four children soon become successful trapeze artists who call themselves the "Four Devils". Charles and Marion are now a couple. But when they perform at Cirque Olympia in Paris, Charles gets involved with a beautiful stranger. Marion learns about the relationship and is distracted by it. At the finale of her performance, in which she works without a net, she crashes. Marion survives, and Charles, touched by the near-catastrophe, returns to his girlfriend.

Cast
 Janet Gaynor as Marion
 Anne Shirley as Marion as a girl (billed as Dawn O'Day)
 Mary Duncan as The lady
 Anders Randolf as Cecchi
 Barry Norton as Adolf
 Philippe De Lacy as Adolf as a child
 Charles Morton as Charles
 Jack Parker as Charles as a child
 André Cheron as Old roue
 George Davis as Mean clown
 Nancy Drexel as Louise
 Anita Louise as Louise as a child
 Wesley Lake as Old clown
 J. Farrell MacDonald as The clown
 Claire McDowell as Woman

Production
4 Devils was released by Fox Film Corporation and was produced by William Fox, who had hired Murnau to come to the United States. It was initially released as a silent with a synchronised music score and sound effects in October 1928, and grossed $100,000 in New York City, but because of the talkie picture craze, Fox pulled it from distribution and ordered sound to be added. A 25% sound version, incorporating "synchronised sound effects, music and dialogue sequences", was made without Murnau's cooperation.

Preservation status
No copies of either version of the film are known to exist, and 4 Devils remains among the most sought after lost films of the silent era. Details of the movie can be found on the DVD for Sunrise, released by Fox as part of their 20th Century Fox Studio Classics collection.

Film historian and collector William K. Everson stated that the only surviving print was lost by actress Mary Duncan, who had borrowed it from Fox Studios. Martin Koerber, curator of Deutsche Kinemathek, is more hopeful, writing that the print was given to Duncan, and that her heirs, if any, may yet have it.

Other adaptations
The source novella by Herman Bang was first adapted into film in 1911 by Robert Dinesen and Alfred Lind, and finally in 1985 by Anders Refn. The screenplay for the 1928 film was novelized by Guy Fowler and published that year by Grosset and Dunlap as a hardcover Photoplay (movie tie-in) Edition.

References

External links
 
 
 4 Devils at Virtual History

1928 films
1928 drama films
Fox Film films
Silent American drama films
American silent feature films
American black-and-white films
Circus films
1920s English-language films
Films about orphans
Films based on works by Herman Bang
Films based on Danish novels
Films directed by F. W. Murnau
Films produced by William Fox
Lost American films
Transitional sound drama films
Films with screenplays by Carl Mayer
Films with screenplays by Berthold Viertel
Remakes of American films
1928 lost films
Lost drama films
Early sound films
1920s American films
English-language drama films